Julianne Buescher is an American actress, writer, and puppeteer who performs in film, television, radio, and on stage. As a voice actress, she is known for many roles including Anko Mitarashi on Naruto. She hails from Cleveland, Ohio. Buescher is also a puppeteer for The Jim Henson Company, appearing with CeeLo Green as "Piddles the Pug" at the 2011 Grammy Awards and as the same character among others in the improvisational adult puppet shows (Puppet Up! and Crank Yankers). She also has worked for both Sesame Street and The Muppets.

Filmography

Movies
 Livin' It Up with the Bratz (2006, interactive movie) (voice) (uncredited) .... Cloe/Jade/Yasmin/Sasha
 Muppets Most Wanted (2014) .... US Muppet Performer, Additional Voices
 Star Trek Into Darkness (2013) .... Additional Voices
 Scooby-Doo! Music of the Vampire (2012, direct-to-video) (voice) .... Vampire Actor #3 and Kelly Smith
 The Wild (2006) .... Dung Beetle #2
 The Muppets' Wizard of Oz (2005) (as Julianne Buscher) .... Muppet Performer
 Geppetto's Secret (2005) (voice) .... Luna/Goldilocks
 Resculpting Venus (1999) .... Kate
 Mulan (1998) .... Young Bride (singing voice)
 Muppet Classic Theater (1994, direct-to-video) .... Yolanda Rat

Anime
 Zatch Bell! (2006) .... Alm, Zabas
 Naruto (2003–2005) .... Anko Mitarashi/Akane

Cartoons
 The Weekenders (2001) .... Frances, Bree, Bebe Cahill
 CatDog (2004) .... Catrin
 American Dad (2005) .... Additional Voices
 Avatar: The Last Airbender (2006) .... Additional Voices
 Sid the Science Kid (2008–2013) .... Grandma, May
 Robot and Monster (2012) .... Tube Voice, Woman

Television
 Howard Beach: Making a Case for Murder (1989) .... Theresa Fisher
 Dinosaurs (1991–1994) .... Robbie Sinclair (eyes), Roy Hess (arms), Baby Sinclair (arms; Season 4), Ansel (face), Aubrey Molehill (face), Crazy Lou (face), Elder No. 3 (face), Ethyl Phillips (face, occasionally), Katie (face), Mindy (face/voice), Monica DeVertebrae (face), Shopper (puppet/voice), Sitcom Wife (puppet/voice), various other characters
 Muppets Tonight (1995–1998) .... Various characters
 The Mr. Potato Head Show (1998–1999) .... Potato Bug, additional voices
 Criminal Minds (2009) .... Meg
 No, You Shut Up! (2013) .... Shelly Spanks
 Community (2013) .... Puppeteer
 Sesame Street .... Blecka the Grouch, Sherry Netherland (1993–1996), Miss A.M. Goat, and others (1991–1998)/Additional Muppets (1991–present)
 The Muppets .... Denise, Yolanda Rat, Debbie(2015–2016)
 Silicon Valley .... Debbie
 Muppets Now (2020) .... Beverly Plume, Yolanda the Rat, Margaret, Rosie the Sheep, Beak-R, Priscilla the Chicken, Brie the Cheese, Elena the Penguin, Some Bunny, a screaming goat, Esther and Mary the Cow
 The Book of Pooh .... Roo
 Muppets Haunted Mansion (2021) .... Yolanda Rat as a Happy Haunt, Beverly Plume as a Happy Haunt, Wanda as a Happy Haunt and Screaming Goat
 Musical Mornings with Coo (2007-2009) ....  Coo

Events
 The Muppets Take the Bowl .... Additional Muppet Performer, Yolanda Rat, Bunny, Wanda, Dr. Teeth's right hand in "Bohemian Rhapsody" (Live show at the Hollywood Bowl, Sept. 8–10, 2017)
 The Muppets Take the O2....Additional Muppet Performer, Yolanda Rat, Bunny, Wanda, Sheep, Dr. Teeth's right hand in "Bohemian Rhapsody" (Live show at the O2 Arena, Jul. 13-14, 2018)

Video games

 Secret Weapons Over Normandy (2003) .... Pauline
 Law & Order: Justice is Served (2004) .... Nicole Beaumont, Claire Thomas
 EverQuest II (2004) .... Generic Female Gnome Merchant, Generic Female Human Merchant, Generic Female Half Elf Merchant, Generic Female Erudite Merchant, Generic Female Dwarf Merchant, Generic Female Halfling Merchant, Generic Female Ratonga Merchant, Generic Female Troll Merchant, Generic Female Dark Elf Merchant
 Guild Wars Prophecies (2005) .... Evennia
 Law & Order: Criminal Intent (2005) .... Jenna Kirkwood, Jennifer Lee, Carla Meyers, Stephanie Novitsky, Barbara Rodriguez, Rosa Sanchez, Rachael Warren
 Guild Wars Nightfall (2006) .... Margrid the Sly, Tormented Soul, Lyssa's Muse
 Livin' It Up with the Bratz (2006) .... Cloe, Yasmin, Sasha, Jade
 The Elder Scrolls V: Skyrim (2011) .... Gabriella, Female Elf Dragonborn, High Elf Females
 Star Wars: The Old Republic (2011) .... Additional Voices
 Kingdoms of Amalur: Reckoning (2012) .... Additional Voices
 Guild Wars 2 (2012) .... Faolain 
 Kinect Fun Labs: Kinect Rush - A Disney Pixar Adventures: Snapshot (2012) .... Additional Voices
 Grand Theft Auto V (2013) .... The Local Population
 The Elder Scrolls Online (2014) .... Additional Voices
 Falling Skies: The Game (2014) .... Spiked Kid Female, Berserker Female
 Batman: Arkham Knight (2015) .... Additional Voices
 Guild Wars 2: Heart of Thorns (2015) .... Faolain
 Final Fantasy XV (2016) .... Additional Voices
 The Elder Scrolls Online: Morrowind (2018) .... Additional Voices
 Kingdom Hearts III (2019) .... Tia Dalma

References

External links

 Julianne Buescher's Official Site
 
 
 The Muppet Newsflash's Interview with Julianne Buescher

Living people
20th-century American actresses
21st-century American actresses
American film actresses
American puppeteers
American stage actresses
American video game actresses
American voice actresses
Daytime Emmy Award winners
Muppet designers
Muppet performers
Place of birth missing (living people)
Sesame Street Muppeteers
1965 births